John P. McLeod (died 1965) was an Australian writer and broadcaster. For a time he was an in-house screenwriter for F.W. Thring at Efftee Studios.

He also worked for the ABC and wrote a number of humorous novels.

Selected writings
A Ticket in Tatts (1934) – screenplay
The Nawab's Necklace; Being Case 102 from the Chronicles of Clipper and Brown, the Dumbest Detectives Ever Devised (1935) – radio play
The Leech; Or, Detectives Don't Care, Being the Hundred and Oneth Case of Clipper and Brown, the Dumbest Detectives Ever Devised (1935) – radio play
Typhoon Treasure (1938) – script
Way Down South (1940)
Funtasia Digest (1941)
Frolics in Politics (1941)
The Progress of Pete (1944)
Quipster Delight (1945)
Jester Digest (1945)
Where Old Friends Meet (1964)

Unfilmed screenplays
It was announced that McLeod would adapt the following novels for Efftee:
James! Don't Be a Fool by E. V. Timms
Along the Road by McLeod

References

External links

Australian writers
1965 deaths